The Yugra Bridge (or Surgut Bridge) is a cable-stayed bridge across the Ob River at Surgut, Russia. It is one of the longest in Siberia. Its central span of  makes it the longest single-tower cable-stayed bridge in the world. The bridge was inaugurated in September 2000 and bridge carries road traffic. A steel truss rail bridge runs parallel to the Yugra Bridge.

See also
List of largest cable-stayed bridges

References

External links
 

Cable-stayed bridges in Russia
Bridges completed in 2000
Transport in Khanty-Mansi Autonomous Okrug
Road bridges in Russia
Bridges over the Ob River